Lake Newell Resort is a hamlet in southern Alberta, Canada within the County of Newell that was established in 2007.

It is accessed from Highway 873 via Township Road 182 to Lake Newell Resort Road.

Demographics 

The population of Lake Newell Resort according to the 2020 municipal census conducted by the County of Newell is 437.

See also 
List of communities in Alberta
List of hamlets in Alberta

References 

County of Newell
Designated places in Alberta
Hamlets in Alberta